is a former professional boxer who fought in the bantamweight division. He successfully defended the WBC bantamweight title four times during his career.

Biography 
Yakushiji began boxing under influence of his father, who was an amateur boxer. He advanced to the semi-finals in the 1986 Inter-high school tournament, and joined the Matsuda boxing gym in 1987, after graduating from high school. He made his professional debut in July of that year.

He made a poor showing early on, winning only 3 of the first 6 fights of his professional career. Even his own trainer doubted that he would win the Japanese title, let alone a world title at this point.

In 1989, he was arrested for speeding on a motorcycle with some of his high school friends, and received a 6-month suspension from the Japanese Boxing Commission. He had to travel to Singapore to continue his training during this period.

In June, 1990, he won a bout by 10-round KO, but his opponent died of injuries several days later. Yakushiji seriously contemplated retirement, but decided to continue his career. He traveled to Los Angeles, and met Japanese-American trainer Mack Kurihara, who greatly increased Yakushiji's skills in the ring. Yakushiji won the Japanese bantamweight title in June, 1991, and defended it once in December before returning it.

On December 23, 1993, Yakushiji got his first shot at the world title, against Jung-Il Byun of South Korea. Yakushiji was actually a substitute for Joichiro Tatsuyoshi, who had sustained a detached left retina, and had backed out of the title match. Yakushiji won by 12 round split decision, winning the WBC bantamweight title. He defended the title once by a 10-round KO win, and faced Byun again in July, 1994, winning again by 11-round TKO after putting Byun down to the canvas five times.

Joichiro Tatsuyoshi had recovered from his injury to win the WBC bantamweight interim title, and after much negotiating and squabbling between the two teams, it was decided that Yakushiji and Tatsuyoshi would face off in a unification match on December 4, 1994, in the Nagoya Rainbow Hall. This was the first ever unification match between two Japanese fighters, and Tatsuyoshi's immense popularity gave the fight much media hype.

Yakushiji was the more accomplished fighter, having defended the bantamweight title twice, and a better record, (22-2-1, as opposed to Tatsuyoshi, who was 10-1-1) but came into the fight as an underdog. Yakushiji landed many short, accurate punches, using his superior speed to counter Tatsuyoshi's wild combinations. Neither fighter went down in 12 rounds, and Yakushiji won by a close 2-0 decision. It was later revealed that Tatsuyoshi had broken his left hand in the 1st round of this fight.

Yakushiji defended his bantamweight title for the fourth time in April, 1995, but lost to Wayne McCullough by split decision to lose his title. He announced his retirement shortly afterwards. His final record was 24-3-1 (16KOs), and he ended his career at the age of 27, without suffering a single knockdown in his 28 professional fights.

Post Retirement 
Yakushiji currently works as an actor and boxing commentator. He has starred in several movies and plays, along with various appearances on television and radio. He is known to be an avid fan of pachinko, and frequently appears on pachinko related television shows. In April, 2007, he opened the Yakushiji Boxing Gym in his hometown, Nagoya.

Professional boxing record

See also 
List of WBC world champions
List of bantamweight boxing champions
Joichiro Tatsuyoshi
List of Japanese boxing world champions
Boxing in Japan

References

External links 
 Yasuei Yakushiji's career record

1968 births
Bantamweight boxers
Living people
People from Ōita Prefecture
World Boxing Council champions
World bantamweight boxing champions
World boxing champions
Japanese male boxers